Kleinbockedra is a municipality in the district Saale-Holzland, in Thuringia, Germany. With 34 inhabitants at the end of 2019, it is the least populous municipality in what used to be East Germany, although there are 23 municipalities with lesser or equal population in what used to be West Germany. All of the Western municipalities are in either Rhineland-Palatinate (17), or Schleswig-Holstein (6).

References

Municipalities in Thuringia
Saale-Holzland-Kreis